Samuel Engel (2 December 1702 – 26 March 1784) was a Swiss librarian, civil servant, economist and agronomist working in Bern who introduced innovations in several fields. He was convinced of the existence of a Northeast Passage and published several influential books about the Arctic.

Early life and education 
Engel was born in Bern as son of Burkhard Engel (1662–1750), Landvogt of the Canton of Bern in Frienisberg Abbey, and Rosina Fischer (died 1752). He studied at the University of Bern from 1718 to 1722, preparing for a career in the civil service. After some travels, he passed the exam as a notary in 1726.

Professional career 
Engel worked as an administrator for orphanages from 1724. From 1736 to 1748, he was head librarian of the city library, which was modernised under his leadership. A bibliophile and collector, he bought so many books at auctions that he had to sell several again at a loss in 1744. He was elected a member of the Grand Council of Bern in 1745 and was Landvogt in Aarberg 1748–1754 and Échallens 1760–1765.

Geography 

Engel was interested in the geography of North America from an early age, and collected many relevant rare books. From 1735, he participated in the scholarly debate about the existence of a land bridge between North America and Asia, and was closely interested in the Great Northern Expedition, especially in the reports of Johann Georg Gmelin, who was in contact with his cousin and friend Albrecht von Haller. 

Despite the observations published by Gmelin, Engel was convinced that an ice free Northeast Passage existed, and tried unsuccessfully to persuade the British Admiralty to send an expedition. The theory was that sea water could not freeze, so any ice in the polar sea must originate from freshwater rivers and be seasonal. Engel's 1765 book  suggesting the existence of a vast empty sea near the North Pole had a great influence in England and France. 

A follower of Engel, Royal Society vice president Daines Barrington wrote to the First Lord of the Admiralty, Lord Sandwich in January 1773, and suggested an expedition to the North Pole. The Admiralty's instructions for Phipps from 25 May 1773 stated he should "proceed up to the North Pole or as far towards it as you are able, carefully avoiding the errors of former navigators by keeping as much as possible in the open sea, and as nearly upon a meridian to the said Pole as the ice or other obstructions you meet with will admit of. If you arrive at the Pole and should even find the sea so open as to admit of a free navigation on the opposite meridian you are not to proceed any further [...]" However, the expedition got stuck in ice near Svalbard and only extricated itself after great difficulties.  

Despite this, Engel and Barrington continued to insist that an ice free polar sea existed. In his 1777 book , he accused the Russian government of falsifying maps and defended his theories about the Northeast Passage.

Engel contributed articles on the geography of Northern Asia and America for Charles-Joseph Panckoucke's supplement to Diderots Encyclopédie. He also wrote an article about the cultivation and culinary use of the potato. In total, he contributed seven articles to volumes I–IV.

References

Footnotes

Bibliography

1702 births
1784 deaths
Swiss librarians
Swiss geographers
Swiss civil servants
Swiss agronomists
Swiss economists
People from Bern